This Is Always is a live album by trumpeter/vocalist Chet Baker which was recorded in 1979 at the Jazzhus Montmartre and released on the Danish SteepleChase label.

Track listing 
 "How Deep Is the Ocean?" (Irving Berlin) – 11:29
 "House of Jade" (Wayne Shorter) – 7:42
 "Love for Sale" (Cole Porter) – 10:30
 "This Is Always" (Harry Warren, Mack Gordon) – 9:14
 "Way to Go Out" (Phil Urso) – 10:02 Bonus track on CD release

Personnel 
Chet Baker – trumpet, vocals
Doug Raney – guitar
Niels-Henning Ørsted Pedersen – bass

References 

Chet Baker live albums
1982 live albums
SteepleChase Records live albums
Albums recorded at Jazzhus Montmartre